The men's pursuit competition at the Biathlon World Championships 2007 was held on 4 February 2007.

Info
Ole Einar Bjørndalen won his second gold medal in as many days,  started in front, but Michal Šlesingr caught up with his four-second deficit before the first shooting, and Šlesingr completed a faultless shoot to take a 15-second lead. Deryzemlya and Björn Ferry missed, so no one else were within fifty seconds of the lead, with a group of three including Tomasz Sikora, Mattias Nilsson and Lars Berger (who advanced 13 places from his starting position through the fastest skiing).

Bjørndalen cut the deficit to Šlesingr by half during the second loop, but Šlesingr held onto his lead thanks to a faultless shoot. Berger and Sikora entered the range fighting for third place, with Emil Hegle Svendsen and Nikolay Kruglov, Jr. close behind, and Sikora, Svendsen and Kruglov (after a slow shooting) filled all their targets to leave within a few seconds of each other.

Bjørndalen and Šlesingr came in together to the first standing shooting, about half a minute ahead of the competitors. The leaders missed a few shots, with Bjørndalen getting one penalty loop and Šlesingr two, and Šlesingr thus lost half a minute and was just ahead of Sikora, who also missed once. Svendsen missed twice and was fourth, over a minute behind, and heading a group also consisting of Lars Berger, Vincent Defrasne and Raphaël Poirée.

Bjørndalen's half-a-minute lead grew to 45 seconds by the time he arrived at the shooting range for the final shoot. With a perfect shooting, he had a massive lead into the final 2.5-kilometre loop, and the fight was for the silver medal. Sikora missed twice, while Šlesingr lost many seconds in shooting speed and also missed a target. In the group behind, Berger had taken a lead before the shooting, but missed three shots, and Svendsen and Poirée also missed to leave Defrasne with a lead of 13 seconds on Šlesingr, but over a minute up to Bjørndalen. Maxim Tchoudov, who had not been better than 14th at any stage, now shot a full house and left the range in a group with Svendsen, Poirée and Sikora.

There were no errors for Bjørndalen, who could ski the final loop as a lap of honour and still win by a minute, while Tchoudov distanced all his competitors in the chase for medals. Svendsen and Poirée were dropped, he caught and left Šlesingr, before pipping Olympic gold medallist Defrasne to the line and taking silver.

Results
The race was started at 11:15.

References

Men's Pursuit